The Cathedral of the Assumption of the Virgin or the Catholic Church of the Ascension of the Virgin Mary It is a Roman Catholic cathedral in Tbilisi, the Georgian capital. It is the seat of the Latin Apostolic Administration of the Caucasus which it was created in 1993 with the decree Quo aptius.

A long history preceded the construction of the structure. Where is the cathedral was where the first Catholics settled in the thirteenth century. In 1240 the Dominicans founded a monastery. In 1328 a cathedral dedicated to St. John the Baptist  was built and Tbilisi became an Episcopal seat (which suspended its operation in the sixteenth century). During the seventeenth century Catholic missionaries returned to Georgia and built a new church dedicated to the Annunciation (the "Latin Church in the Catholic form"). This Catholic structure were then privately for King Teimuraz II.

The current cathedral was built in front of the Church of the Annunciation (no longer exists) between 1805 and 1808 by the monk Philipo Foranian. In 1937 the church was confiscated by the soviets, but after Georgia regained independence it was returned to the faithful in 1999.

See also
Roman Catholicism in Georgia

References

Roman Catholic cathedrals in Georgia (country)
Churches in Tbilisi
Roman Catholic churches completed in 1808
19th-century Roman Catholic church buildings